Canik Başarı University, başarı meaning "success", was a private university in Canik, a district of Samsun, Turkey.

Established in 2012 and directed by a foundation ("Vakıf" in Turkish), it constituted the first private university in Samsun Province, The university was one out of fifteen private universities that were closed by the Turkish government in the course of the 2016 Turkish purges following the 15 July failed coup attempt.

Subjects

Undergraduate: Teaching Turkish, Counseling psychology, Molecular Biology and Genetics, Management, International Trade and Management, Building Engineering, Architecture

Masters: MBA, Health Administration, Education Management Planning and Economics

References

External links 
  
 Facebook

Private universities and colleges in Turkey
Education in Samsun
Educational institutions established in 2012
2012 establishments in Turkey
Educational institutions shut down in the 2016 Turkish purges
Defunct universities and colleges in Turkey